Celia Jokisch (born 13 September 1954) is a Salvadoran former swimmer. She competed in the women's 100 metre breaststroke at the 1968 Summer Olympics.

References

External links
 

1954 births
Living people
Salvadoran female swimmers
Olympic swimmers of El Salvador
Swimmers at the 1968 Summer Olympics
Sportspeople from San Salvador
20th-century Salvadoran women